Megalaria is a genus of lichenized fungi in the family Ramalinaceae. The genus was circumscribed by Austrian lichenologist Josef Hafellner in 1984.

Species
Megalaria allantoidea
Megalaria beechingii
Megalaria bryophila
Megalaria endochroma
Megalaria grossa
Megalaria intermixta
Megalaria leptocheila
Megalaria macrospora
Megalaria melanotropa
Megalaria obludens
Megalaria orokonuiana
Megalaria pulverea

References

Lecanorales
Lichen genera
Lecanorales genera
Taxa named by Josef Hafellner
Taxa described in 1984